The Holy Sisters of the Gaga Dada were an eclectic band originally from Santa Cruz, California, US, formed in 1981. They were voted "Best Alternative Rock Band of the Year" by LA Weekly. The collaboration of keyboardist Mary Jean Shaffer and guitarist Blancah Black, the Holy Sisters included quasi-religious imagery and feminist politics. Other original members included Heidi Puckett (bass) and Jeff Grubic (tenor sax). As the band morphed from conceptual entity to frequent club performers, Black left and two new members were added, Jill Fido (bass) and Charles Bingham (drums). Kim Sockit later replaced Puckett, and Zero Jessephski Jr. replaced Bingham, making the Holy Sisters of the Gaga Dada an all-female band. The group would later move to Hollywood, California, where they were featured in "Once Upon Her Time", a TV program about women in the 1980s which aired on the Lifetime Cablevision Network.

Personnel
 Jill Fido: bass, Vocals
 Wild Kim Sockit: guitar, percussion, penny whistle, vocals
 Mary Jean Shaffer: keyboards, vocals
 Zero Jessephski Jr.: drums, toys, percussion
 Cathy Linstrom: guitar

Discography
 Let's Get Acquainted (1986; Bomp! Records)
 At Dianne's Place (compilation; includes "Round and Round") (1987; Penultimate Records)
 Gaga at the Gogo EP (1988; Bomp! Records)
 Radio Tokyo Tapes Vol. 4 (compilation; includes one song, a cover version of "Paranoid" by Black Sabbath) (1989; Chameleon Records)

See also
 List of all-women bands

References

External links
 Photo of show at Graffiti, S.F., 1985
 The Holy Sisters at DNA, S.F., 1987 photo, photo, photo, photo, photo, photo

All-female bands
Musical groups established in 1981
History of women in California